Harder is an unincorporated community in Franklin County, Washington, United States

Notes

Unincorporated communities in Franklin County, Washington
Unincorporated communities in Washington (state)